The New England Hotel is an historic building in Victoria, British Columbia, Canada.

See also
 List of historic places in Victoria, British Columbia

References

External links
 

Hotels in Victoria, British Columbia